The 1985 Swiss Indoors was a men's tennis tournament played on indoor hard courts at the St. Jakobshalle in Basel, Switzerland that was part of the 1985 Nabisco Grand Prix. It was the 16th edition of the tournament and was held from 14 October through 21 October 1985. Second-seeded Stefan Edberg won the singles title.

Finals

Singles
 Stefan Edberg defeated  Yannick Noah 6–7, 6–4, 7–6, 6–1
 It was Edberg's 3rd singles title of the year and the 4th of his career.

Doubles
 Tim Gullikson /  Tom Gullikson defeated  Mark Dickson /  Tim Wilkison 4–6, 6–4, 6–4

References

External links
 Official website 
 ITF tournament edition details

Swiss Indoors, 1985
Swiss Indoors
1985 in Swiss tennis